Lobéké National Park (alternate: Lake Lobake National Park) is a national park of southeastern Cameroon within the Moloundou Arrondissement of East Province. Located in the Congo Basin, it is bounded on the east by the Sangha River which serves as Cameroon's international border with Central African Republic and the Republic of the Congo. It is adjacent to two other reserves in the CAR and Congo. To the northwest is Boumba Bek National Park, another national park in Cameroon's East Province.

In a conference of the Ministers of Forests of Central African Forest Commission (COMIFAC), it had been resolved to establish within the Congo basin, the Sangha River Tri-national Protected area (STN) encompassing the Dzanga Sangha Special Reserve in the Central African Republic, which incorporates the Nouabalé-Ndoki National Park in the Republic of Congo (Brazzaville) and the Lobéké National Park in Cameroon.

History
Already in 1991, the WWF had conducted a biological assessment of the area and recommended that the Lobéké area be protected, recommending that the unexploited 40,000 hectares be expanded to encompass over 400,000 hectares. In October 1999, the park was declared a National Park.  In the same year the so-called Yaoundé Declaration was signed, forming a tri-national park agreement of cooperation with Dzanga-Sangha Forest Reserve in the Central African Republic and the Nouabalé-Ndoki National Park in the Republic of Congo. This tri-park area, called the Sangha Trinational is operated by the Central African Forest Commission (COMIFAC), and is overlooked and funded by international wildlife groups such as the World Wildlife Fund, the German Cooperation of Technical Collaboration (GTZ) and the Wildlife Conservation Society (WCS). In 2012, the entire Sangha Trinational protected area (including Lobéké National Park) became a World Heritage Site.

Geography

Lobéké National Park belongs to the Moloundou arrondissement, located in the vicinity of Boumba-et-Ngoko. The Moloundou area has been described as "one of the richest rubber areas of Africa" and the Germans established a rubber making plant in the area. The park is located close to the borders with neighbouring Republic of Congo and Central African Republic,  which is why the tri-national environmental initiative with the park and Dzanga-Sangha Forest Reserve and the Nouabalé-Ndoki National Park was made. More than twelve natural savannas, characterized as saline swamps, occur within the park. There are also sandbars on the Sangha. The annual rainfall averages 1400 mm., with the dry season occurring from December through February. Large forest clearings, or bais, have soils rich in various minerals that attract the mega fauna of the forest. Lobéké is the home of many different ethnic groups including the Baka, the Bantu and the Bangando.

Flora and fauna
Lobéké is predominantly a semi-evergreen forest, most of which has never been logged.  The forest is characterized by an enormous variety of plants. Dominant species include Malvaceae (Triplochiton scleroxylon, Pterygota, Ceiba pentandra) and Terminalia superba. The understorey consists of Marantaceae-Zingiberaceae thicket, or Ebenaceae and Annonaceae trees. Near streams there are clusters of Gilbertiodendron dewevrei. Palm thickets and sedge marshes border the savannas. There are more than 300 species of trees in Lobéké.

Some of the highest densities of African forest elephants and western lowland gorillas in all of Africa are found in Lobéké.  Other animals include primates, such as chimpanzees, gorillas, leopards, as well as ten species of forest ungulates. In addition to mammals, fauna inventory includes 215 species of butterflies, 134 species of fish, 18 species of reptiles, and 16 species of amphibians.

Lobéké National Park is an Important Bird Area (#CM033). Over three hundred species of birds have been recorded here. The African green pigeon, hornbills, yellow-throated cuckoo, sandy scops owl and the chocolate-backed kingfisher can all be found in the park. Specifically within Cameroon and Gabon, it is an important bird area for the Dja River scrub warbler.

Environmental issues
Due to Lobéké' proximity to Congo and CAR, the park is part of a tri-national environmental initiative that includes the Dzanga Sangha Special Reserve of CAR and the Nouabalé-Ndoki National Park of the Republic of the Congo.

Timber exploitation and safari hunting are a concern, as well as poaching for bushmeat, exotic animals, and ivory.  Illegal fishing or bird poaching is a major problem and every year thousands of African gray parrots are caught and exported illegally.  Even in 1997, when the government placed a ban on the export of birds, many birds were still caught and sold illegally for traditional medicine and other reasons. Mineral deposits have not been ruled out.  A growing local population is dependent upon local resources.

See also
 Wildlife of Cameroon

References

Further reading
 Dowsett-Lemaire, F., & Dowsett, R. J. (March 1, 2000). "Birds of the Lobéké Faunal Reserve, Cameroon, and its regional importance for conservation". Bird Conservation International, 10, 1, 67–87. 
 Jell, B., & Machado, J. S. (January 1, 2002). "Collaborative Management in the Region of Lobeke, Cameroon: The Potentials and Constraints in Involving the Local Population in Protected Area Management". Nomadic Peoples, 6, 180–203. 
 Ngenyi, A. N. Z. U. L. (2004). The impact of capture and trade in African grey parrot populations ( Psittacus erithacus ) in Lobeke National Park, south east Cameroon. 3, 1.

National parks of Cameroon
Protected areas established in 1999
Important Bird Areas of Cameroon
1999 establishments in Cameroon